

Edward Peter Djerejian (born March 6, 1939) is a former United States diplomat who served in eight administrations from John F. Kennedy to Bill Clinton (1962–94.) He served as the United States Ambassador to Syria (1988–91) and  Israel (1993–94), Special Assistant to President Ronald Reagan and Deputy Press Secretary of Foreign Affairs (1985–1986), and was Assistant Secretary of State for Near Eastern Affairs (1991–1993.)  He was the founding director of Rice University's Baker Institute for Public Policy (1994-2022) He is a senior fellow at the Middle East Initiative at Harvard Kennedy School's Belfer Center for Science and International Affairs, a fellow of the American Academy of Arts and Sciences and is on the board of trustees of the Carnegie Corporation of New York. Djerejian was elected chairman of Occidental Petroleum Corporation’s board of directors (2013–2015).  Djerejian is the author of the book Danger and Opportunity: An American Ambassador's Journey Through the Middle East (Simon & Schuster, Threshold Editions, September 2008. )

Life and education
Of Armenian descent, Djerejian was born in New York in 1939. He graduated from Georgetown University in 1960. Djerejian served in the US Army in Korea for the next two years, and then joined the Foreign Service.

Besides English, he speaks Arabic, Armenian, French, and Russian.

Career

He served as special assistant to Under Secretary of State George Ball (1962–64), a political officer in Beirut, Lebanon (1965–69) and in Casablanca, Morocco (1969–72), executive assistant to Under Secretary of State Joseph J. Sisco (1972–1975), consul general in Bordeaux, France (1975–77), officer in the Bureau of European Affairs (1978–79),  chief of the US Embassy's political section in Moscow (1979–81), deputy chief of the US Mission to Jordan (1981–84), Special Assistant to President Ronald Reagan and Deputy Press Secretary of Foreign Affairs (1985–1986), Deputy Assistant Secretary of Near Eastern and South Asian Affairs (1986–88), Ambassador to Syria (1989–1991), Assistant Secretary of State for Near Eastern Affairs (1991–93), United States Ambassador to Israel (1993–94),  He was Director of the James A. Baker III Institute for Public Policy at Rice University (August 1994–2022). In 2021 the Baker Institute was ranked the #1 University-Affiliated Think Tank in the World by the University of Pennsylvania Global Think Tank Survey.

Djerejian, as Assistant Secretary of State for Near Eastern Affairs in an official speech at Meridian House, coined the description of the purported democratic goals of Islamic radicals as "One man, one vote, one time."

Ambassador Djerejian was asked by Secretary of State Colin Powell to chair the congressionally mandated bipartisan Advisory Group on Public Diplomacy for the Arab and Muslim World which published its report in October 2003. He was Senior Policy Advisor to the congressionally mandated bipartisan Iraq Study Group which published its report in December 2006. In 2010, he chaired the Baker Institute's workshop that produced the report "Getting to the Territorial Endgame of an Israeli-Palestinian Peace Settlement".

Djerejian is the author of the book Danger and Opportunity: An American Ambassador's Journey Through the Middle East.

Ambassador Djerejian has been awarded the Presidential Distinguished Service Award, the Department of State's Distinguished Honor Award, the President's Meritorious Service Award, the Anti-Defamation League’s Moral Statesman Award, the Ellis Island Medal of Honor, the Award for Humanitarian Diplomacy from Netanya Academic College in Israel, and the Association of Rice Alumni 2009 Gold Medal—the highest honor bestowed by the association in recognition of extraordinary service to the university.  Djerejian is also the recipient of the National Order of the Cedar bestowed by President Lahoud of Lebanon, the Order of Ouissam Alaouite bestowed by King Mohammed VI of Morocco and the Medal of Honor bestowed by President Sargsyan of Armenia.

 Ambassador Djerejian was Chairman of Occidental Petroleum Corporation’s Board of Directors between 2013–2015. In 2011, he was named to the board of trustees of the Carnegie Corporation of New York and Vice Chairman of the Board (2018-2019). Also in 2011, Djerejian was elected a fellow of the American Academy of Arts and Sciences.

He served in the United States Army as a first lieutenant in the Republic of Korea following his graduation from the School of Foreign Service at Georgetown University. He holds a Bachelor of Science from Georgetown University, as well as an honorary doctorate in humanities from Georgetown and an honorary Doctor of Laws degree from Middlebury College.

He is married to Françoise Andree Liliane Marie (Haelters) Djerejian. They have two children, Gregory Peter Djerejian and Francesca Natalia Djerejian, and four grandchildren, Isabel Djerejian, Sebastian Djerejian, Cassandra Colombe Vargas and Camila Ava Vargas.

In October 2016 Djerejian joined other prominent Armenians on calling the government of Armenia to adopt "new development strategies based on inclusiveness and collective action" and to create "an opportunity for the Armenian world to pivot toward a future of prosperity, to transform the post-Soviet Armenian Republic into a vibrant, modern, secure, peaceful and progressive homeland for a global nation."

Notes and references

External links
 Ambassador Edward Djerejian speaks to Forward Magazine
 

Walsh School of Foreign Service alumni
American people of Armenian descent
Ambassadors of the United States to Israel
1939 births
Living people
Rice University faculty
Ambassadors of the United States to Syria
Fellows of the American Academy of Arts and Sciences
Assistant Secretaries of State for the Near East and North Africa
United States Foreign Service personnel